Quincy Water Company Pumping Station was a historic pumping station at 106 Penn Street in Quincy, Massachusetts.  The two-story brick Italianate building was built in 1883 to meet the demand of Quincy's growing population for water.  In addition to the pumping facilities, the building house offices and an apartment for the superintendent.  Its use as a pumping station was discontinued in 1899 after Quincy joined with what is now called the MWRA.

The building was listed on the National Register of Historic Places in 1989, but  has since been demolished.

See also
National Register of Historic Places listings in Quincy, Massachusetts

References

Industrial buildings and structures on the National Register of Historic Places in Massachusetts
Buildings and structures in Quincy, Massachusetts
National Register of Historic Places in Quincy, Massachusetts